Rainer Semet (born 4 September 1957) is a German engineer and politician of the Free Democratic Party (FDP) who has been serving as a member of the Bundestag since 2021.

Early life and career
Semet was born 1957 in the West German city of Stuttgart. He graduated in engineering management from the Rosenheim University of Applied Sciences and the Berlin University of Applied Sciences and Technology.

Political career
Semet became member of the Bundestag in 2021, representing the Pforzheim district. In parliament, he has since been serving on the Committee on Housing, Urban Development, Building and Local Government, the Committee on Foreign Affairs and its Subcommittee on the United Nations, International Organizations and Civil Crisis Prevention.

In addition to his committee assignments, Semet was part of the German-Iranian Parliamentary Friendship Group from 2021 until its dissolution in 2023.

References

Living people
Politicians from Stuttgart
1957 births
21st-century German politicians
Members of the Bundestag 2021–2025